Emma Tahapari (born 7 April 1961) is an Indonesian sprinter. She competed in the women's 200 metres at the 1984 Summer Olympics.

References

External links
 

1961 births
Living people
Athletes (track and field) at the 1984 Summer Olympics
Indonesian female sprinters
Olympic athletes of Indonesia
Sportspeople from Jakarta
Olympic female sprinters
20th-century Indonesian women